Clinical and Experimental Hypertension is a peer-reviewed medical journal that covers all aspects of human and animal hypertension. It was established in 1978 and is published by Taylor & Francis. The editor-in-chief is Mustafa F. Lokhandwala (University of Houston). According to the Journal Citation Reports, the journal has a 2014 impact factor of 1.234.

References

External links 
 

Publications established in 1978
English-language journals
Hypertension journals
Taylor & Francis academic journals